Harvest: Contemporary Mormon Poems (Signature Books, 1989), edited by Eugene England and Dennis Clark, was the first attempt at a comprehensive collection of  Mormon poets and poetry.

Included poets

Paul L. Anderson
Kathryn R. Ashworth
Danielle Beazer
Elouise Bell
Mary Blanchard
Mary Lythgoe Bradford
Marilyn McMeen Miller Brown
Robert A. Christmas
Dennis Clark
Marden J. Clark
Iris Parker Corry
Karen Lynn Davidson
John Davies
Colin B. Douglas
Eugene England
Kathy Evans
Brewster Ghiselin
Stephen Gould
Steven William Graves
Randall L. Hall
Laura Hamblin
John Sterling Harris
Edward L. Hart
Lewis Horne
Donnell Hunter
Clifton Holt Jolley
Susan Elizabeth Howe
Bruce W. Jorgensen
Randall L. Hall
Patricia Gunter Karamesines
Arthur Henry King
Karl Keller
Lance Larsen
Clinton F. Larson
Timothy Liu
Rob Hollis Miller
Karen Marguerite Moloney
Margaret R. Munk
Reid Nibley
Veneta Leatham Nielsen
Leslie Norris
M. D. Palmer
Dixie Lee Partridge
Carol Lynn Pearson
Vernice Wineera Pere
Robert A. Rees
Karl C. Sandberg
John W. Schouten
Linda Sillitoe
Loretta Randall Sharp
William Stafford
Helen Candland Stark
May Swenson
Anita Tanner
Sally T. Taylor
Stephen Orson Taylor
Emma Lou Thayne
Richard Ellis Tice
P. Karen Todd
Philip White
Ronald Wilcox
David L. Wright

See also
Mormon poetry
Fire in the Pasture: 21st Century Mormon Poets

American poetry collections
1989 books
Mormon poetry
Signature Books books